Alexander Andreyevich Bessmertnykh (born 15 September 1986) is a Russian cross-country skier. In December 2017, he was one of eleven Russian athletes who were banned for life from the Olympics by the International Olympic Committee, as a result of doping offences at the 2014 Winter Olympics.

Career
He represented Russia at the 2014 Winter Olympics in Sochi. On 16 February he ran the second (classical) leg in the men's team relay, together with his teammates Dmitry Yaparov, Alexander Legkov, and Maxim Vylegzhanin, and originally won a silver medal. In December 2017, he was one of eleven Russian athletes who were banned for life from the Olympics by the International Olympic Committee, after doping offences at the 2014 Winter Olympics. Bessmertnykh's results from the 2014 Winter Olympics were annulled. On 1 February 2018, their results were restored as a result of the successful appeal.

Cross-country skiing results
All results are sourced from the International Ski Federation (FIS).

Olympic Games
 1 medal – (1 silver)

World Championships
 3 medals – (3 silver)

World Cup

Season standings

Individual podiums
6 podiums – (5 , 1 )

Team podiums
 2 victories – (2 ) 
 3 podiums – (3 )

Notes

References

External links

Russian male cross-country skiers
Olympic cross-country skiers of Russia
Cross-country skiers at the 2014 Winter Olympics
People from Kemerovo Oblast
1986 births
Living people
FIS Nordic World Ski Championships medalists in cross-country skiing
Tour de Ski skiers
Competitors stripped of Winter Olympics medals
Russian sportspeople in doping cases
Doping cases in cross-country skiing
Olympic silver medalists for Russia
Sportspeople from Kemerovo Oblast